Tham Simpson (born 8 April 1969 in Vietnam) is a paralympic athlete from Canada competing mainly in category 1C events. She was born in Vietnam but adopted by Canadian parents in Toronto.

Simpson competed in the 1984 Summer Paralympics in athletics aged just 15, winning five gold medals.

References

1969 births
Living people
Athletes (track and field) at the 1984 Summer Paralympics
Athletes (track and field) at the 1988 Summer Paralympics
Paralympic gold medalists for Canada
Athletes from Toronto
Vietnamese emigrants to Canada
Medalists at the 1984 Summer Paralympics
Paralympic medalists in athletics (track and field)
Paralympic track and field athletes of Canada
Canadian female wheelchair racers